Bjarne Fog Corydon (born 1 March 1973) is a Danish former politician, who was a member of the Folketing from the Social Democrats from 2011 to 2016. He served as Finance Minister of Denmark in the Cabinet of Helle Thorning-Schmidt from 2011 to 2015, and was formerly her secretary.

Political career 
In 2011 he was elected to the Folketing, and was appointed Minister of Finance by Helle Thorning-Schmidt. He was behind the controversial sale of the Danish company DONG to the american Goldman Sachs in 2014, which led the Socialist People's Party to leave the government coalition.

After he left the Folketing in 2016, Corydon worked for the management consulting company McKinsey & Co, and he was in 2018 appointed new CEO and Editor-in-Chief of Dagbladet Børsen, a Danish newspaper specialising in business news published in Denmark.

References

External links
 
 Bjarne Corydon's website

1973 births
People from Kolding
Government ministers of Denmark
Living people
Social Democrats (Denmark) politicians
Danish Finance Ministers
McKinsey & Company people
Members of the Folketing 2011–2015
Members of the Folketing 2015–2019